Senjozan Dam is a rockfill dam located in Tottori prefecture in Japan. The dam is used for irrigation. The catchment area of the dam is 6.5 km2. The dam impounds about 7  ha of land when full and can store 720 thousand cubic meters of water. The construction of the dam was started on 1979 and completed in 2003.

References

Dams in Tottori Prefecture
2003 establishments in Japan